A normalista is a novel written by the Brazilian writer Adolfo Caminha. It was first published in 1891.

External links
 A Normalista, the book

1891 Brazilian novels